The Jew (Russian: Жид zhid) is an 1847 short story by Ivan Turgenev. A young Russian officer, in the camp outside Danzig where Napoleon's army is besieged in 1812, falls in love with the daughter of Girshel, a Jew who follows the Russian camp. Girshel does everything to promote his interest, but is arrested for espionage on behalf of the besieged French, and hanged by order of the military authorities, despite the officer's request for pardon.

References

Russian text
https://en.wikisource.org/wiki/The_Jew_(Turgenev) 

Fiction set in 1812
1847 short stories
Gdańsk in fiction
Novellas by Ivan Turgenev
Short stories set in Poland